Pygmalion or Pigmalion may refer to:

Mythology
 Pygmalion (mythology), a sculptor who fell in love with his statue

Stage
 Pigmalion (opera), a 1745 opera by Jean-Philippe Rameau
 Pygmalion (Rousseau), a 1762 melodrama by Jean-Jacques Rousseau
 Pygmalion (opera), a 1779 duodrama opera by Georg Anton Benda
 Pygmalion, an 1808 opera by Karol Kurpiński
 Pimmalione, an 1809 opera by Luigi Cherubini
 Il Pigmalione, an 1816 opera by Gaetano Donizetti
 Die schöne Galathée, an 1865 operetta by Franz von Suppé
 Pygmalion; or, The Statue Fair, an 1867 musical burlesque by William Brough
 Pygmalion, ou La Statue de Chypre, an 1883 ballet with choreography by Marius Petipa
 Pygmalion (play), a 1913 play by George Bernard Shaw

Film
Pygmalion (1935 film), a German film based on the George Bernard Shaw play
Pygmalion (1937 film), a Dutch  film based on the George Bernard Shaw play
 Pygmalion (1938 film), a British film starring Leslie Howard and Wendy Hiller
Pygmalion (1948 film), a British television film starring Margaret Lockwood
 Pygmalion (1983 film), a television film starring Peter O'Toole and Margot Kidder
 "Pigmalion" (Back at the Barnyard episode), a 2008 episode of the television series Back at the Barnyard

Music
 Pygmalion (album), an experimental ambient album by Slowdive
 Pygmalion (ensemble), French baroque ensemble
 "Pygmalion", a song by the darkwave group Lycia (band)
 "Pygmalion", a song from the 2001 album Doll Doll Doll by Venetian Snares

People
 Pygmalion of Tyre, a King of Tyre
 Pygmalion (name), a given name

Other uses
 96189 Pygmalion, a planet
 Pygmalion, a narrative work by Thomas Woolner (1880s)
 Pygmalion, a character in Virgil's Aeneid (29–19 B.C.)
 "Pigmalion", a  2003 episode of the animated series King of the Hill

See also
 Pygmalion and Galatea (disambiguation)
 Pygmalion and the Image series, a series of four paintings by Sir Edward Coley Burne-Jones (1878)
 Pygmalion effect
 Pygmalionism
 My Fair Lady (disambiguation)